This is an alphabetical list of Welsh women.

A
Jane Aaron (born 1951), literature scholar, researcher, non-fiction writer
Janet Ackland (born 1938), bowler
Helen Adams (born 1978), television personality
Sian Adey-Jones (born 1957), model, actress
Wendy Albiston (born 1969), actress
Jessica Allen (born 1989), racing cyclist
Jan Anderson (born 1974), actress
Elizabeth Andrews (1882–1960), suffragist, writer
Josie d'Arby (born 1972), actress, writer, television presenter
Jane Arden (1927–1982), film director, actress, screenwriter, playwright, poet
Kim Ashfield (born 1959), model
Laura Ashley (1925–1985), fashion designer
Tiffany Atkinson (born 1972), poet, educator
Trezza Azzopardi (born 1961), widely translated novelist, short story writer, author of The Hiding Place
Janet Ackland (born 1938), bowler

B
Emilia Baeyertz (1842–1926), Christian missionary
Mary Balogh (born 1944), Welsh-Canadian historical novelist
Iona Banks (1920–2008), actress
Elinor Barker (born 1994), racing cyclist
Lorraine Barrett (born 1950), politician
Rachel Barrett (1874–1953), suffragette, newspaper editor
Shirley Bassey (born 1937), singer
Anne Beale (1816–1900), popular novelist, poet, children's writer
Remy Beasley (active since 2015), actress
Eirlys Bellin (active since 2000s), actress
Anna Maria Bennett (c.1750–1808), novelist
Jane Brereton (1685–1740), English-language poet
Tara Bethan (born 1984), actress, singer
Bridget Bevan (1698–1779), educationalist and public benefactor
Ruth Bidgood (born 1922), poet
Joyce Bland (1906–1963), film actress
Cate Le Bon (born 1983), singer-songwriter
Di Botcher (active since 1986), actress
Ffion Bowen (born 1991), rugby union player
Nan Braunton (1895–1978), actress
Jane Brereton (1685–1740), poet, contributor to The Gentleman's Magazine 
Becky Brewerton (born 1982), golfer
Rhoda Broughton (1840–1920), novelist, short story writer
Mia Arnesby Brown (1867–1931), painter
Eleanor Bufton (1842–1893), actress
Fanny Bulkeley-Owen (1845–1927), historian, writer
Frances Bunsen (1791–1876), painter, writer
Eleanor Bufton (active since 2004), actress

C
Betsi Cadwaladr  (1789–1860), nurse in the Crimean War
Julia Callan-Thompson (1944–1979), model, designer, socialite
Saint Callwen (6th century), Christian saint
Saint Canna (6th century), nun
Nia Caron (active since 1980s), Welsh-language actress
Emma Catherwood (born 1981), actress, model
Emma Catherwood (1968), actress
Jane Cave (c.1754–1812), English-language poet
Christine Chapman (born 1956), politician
Brenda Chamberlain (1912–1971), artist, poet
Kara Chesworth (born 1972), racing cyclist
Shefali Chowdhury (born 1988), actress
Sybil Christopher (1929–2013), actress, theatre director 
Charlotte Church (born 1986), singer
Gillian Clarke (born 1937), poet, playwright, translator, broadcaster
Hafina Clwyd (1936–2011), educator, writer
Grace Coddington (born 1941), fashion writer, director of Vogue, memoirist
Lu Corfield (active since 2012), actress
Nicole Cooke (born 1983), racing cyclist
Glenys Cour (born 1924), painter, stained glass artist
Shân Cothi (born 1965), singer, actress
Margaret Courtenay (1923–1996), actress, singer, entertainer
Elinor Crawley (born 1991), actress
Leila Crerar (active since 1980s), actress
Jasmine Cresswell (born 1941), best selling novelist
Katie Curtis (born 1988), road and track cyclist

D
Fflur Dafydd (born 1978), novelist, playwright, poet, singer, writes in Welsh and English
Hannah Daniel (born 1986), actress
Lisa Lee Dark (born 1981), opera singer, voice actress
Jennifer Daniel (born 1936), film actress
Alexa Davies (born 1995), actress
Catherine Glyn Davies (1926–2007), historian, translator
Clara Novello Davies (1861–1943), singer and conductor
Deddie Davies (born 1938), actress
Deborah Kay Davies, contemporary poet, novelist, educator
Edna Davies (1905–1969), actress
Gwendoline Davies (1882–1951), philanthropist, arts patron
Jocelyn Davies (born 1959), politician
Karen Davies (born 1965), golfer
Llewela Davies (1871–1952), pianist and composer
Lynette Davies (1948–1993), actress
Margaret Davies (fl. 1700s), poet, scribe
Margaret Davies (1884–1963), arts patron
Mary Davies (1855–1930), mezzo-soprano
Mary Davies (1846–1882), poet
Nina Davies (born 1974), racing cyclist
Phoebe Davies (1864–1912), Welsh-born American actress
Rachel Davies (1846–1915), lecturer and evangelist preacher
Rose Davies (1882–1958), teacher, activist, politician
Valerie Davies (1912–2001), swimmer
Rebecca De Filippo (born 1994), rugby union player
Cherry Dee (born 1987), model
Sophie Dee (born 1984), pornographic actress
Jen Delyth (born 1962), specializing in Celtic symbolism
Myrtle Devenish (1913–2007), actress 
Marina Diamandis (born 1985), singer-songwriter
Amy Dillwyn (1845–1935), novelist, industrialist
Thereza Dillwyn Llewelyn, photographer, astronomer
Leila Crerar (born 1984), actress
Aimée Ann Duffy (born 1984), singer, songwriter
Ruth Dunning (1911–1983), actress

E
Aimee-Ffion Edwards (born 1987), actress
Mary Anne Edmunds (1813–1858), educator
Donna Edwards (born 1963), actress
Dorothy Edwards (1903–1934), novelist, short story writer
Fanny Winifred Edwards (1876–1959), schoolteacher, children's writer, dramatist
Maudie Edwards (1906–1991), actress, singer, comedian
Rhian Edwards (active from 2000s), poet
Sarah Edwards (1881–1965), Welsh born American actress 
Sara Edwards (born 1961), broadcast journalist, television presenter
Elen Egryn (1807–1897), Welsh-language poet
Menna Elfyn (born 1952), Welsh-language poet, playwright, columnist, editor, poetry widely translated
Gillian Elisa (born 1953), actress, singer, comedian
Amy Evans (1884–1983), soprano, actress
Peg Entwistle (1908–1932), actress
Claire Evans (born 1983), model
Christine Evans (born 1943), poet
Elen Evans (born 1985), rugby union player
Jennifer Evans (active since 2004), actress
Kate Williams Evans (1866–1961), suffragette and activist for women's rights
Laura Evans (active since 1990s), actress, singer, songwriter
Margiad Evans (1909–1958), poet, novelist
Mary Evans (1735–1789), sect leader
Maxine Evans (born 1966), actress
Sophie Evans (born 1993), singer, actress
Laura Evans-Williams (1883–1944), soprano

F
Pam Ferris (born 1948), actress
Catrin Finch (born 1980), harpist
Ilora Finlay, Baroness Finlay of Llandaff (born 1949), physician, politician
Catherine Fisher (born 1957), novelist, poet, broadcaster
Connie Fisher (born 1983), actress, singer
Laura Ford (born 1961), sculptor
Rosemarie Frankland (1943–2000), actress, model
Jane Freeman (born 1921), actress
Jocelyn Freeman (born 1986), pianist 
Kathleen Freeman (1897–1959), classicist
Liz Fuller (born 1975), television presenter, actress, model

G
Menna Gallie (1919–1990), novelist, translator
Valerie Ganz (1936–2015), painter
Jacqui Gasson (active since 1988), lord mayor of Cardiff
Beti George (born 1939), journalist and broadcaster
Seren Gibson (born 1988), model
Sian Gibson (born 1976), actress, writer
Olive Gilbert (1898–1981), singer, actress
Annabel Giles (born 1950), broadcaster, best selling novelist, actress
Julia Gillard (born 1961), Australian prime minister
Mary Dilys Glynne (1895–1991), plant pathologist, mountaineer
Julie Gould (born 1989), swimmer
Helen Grace (active since 2004), film director
Janice Gregory (born 1955), politician
Sara Gregory (born 1986), actress
Clare Greenwood (born 1958), cyclist
Elizabeth Griffith (1727–1793), writer
Helen Griffin (active since the 1980s), actress, writer
Ann Griffiths (1776–1805), religious poet, hymn writer
Lesley Griffiths (born 1960), politician
Amy Guy (born 1983), model
Lady Charlotte Guest (1812–1895), aristocrat and translator
Bethan Gwanas, pen name of Bethan Evans (born 1962), Welsh-language novelist, children's writer
Saint Gwenfyl (fl. 6th century), Christian saint
Lowri Gwilym (1954––2010), television and radio producer
Eirwen Gwynn (1916–2007), nationalist, writer, teacher and scientist
Gwenllian ferch Gruffydd (1097–1137), Princess Consort of Deheubarth
Gwenllian of Wales (1282–1337), daughter of Llywelyn ap Gruffudd
Gwerful Fychan (fl. 1420–1490), Welsh-language poet
Denise Gyngell (born 1961), singer, actress, model

H
Cerys Hale (born 1993), rugby union player
Holly Hale (born 1990), model
Augusta Hall, Baroness Llanover (1802–1896), arts patron
Nina Hamnett (1890–1956), painter
Doris Hare (1905–2000), actress, singer
Mali Harries (born c.1976), actress
Edwina Hart (born 1957), politician
Ann Hatton (1764–1838), novelist
Myfanwy Haycock (1913–1963), poet, artist, broadcaster
Angela Hazeldine (born 1981), actress, musician
Venissa Head (born 1956), track and field athlete
Anneliese Heard (born 1981), cyclist
Georgia Henshaw (born 1993), actress
Deirdre Hine (born 1937), physician
Sally Hodge (born 1966), cyclist
Frances Hoggan (1843–1927), physician, first female doctor registered in Wales
Sophie Holland (active since 2000s), actress
Karen Holford (active since 1990), engineer and professor
Nichola Hope (born 1975), painter, writer, silhouettist
Sarah Hope (born 1975), twin sister of Nichola, painter, writer, actress
Mary Hopkin (born 1950), singer
Sally El Hosaini (born 1976), film director, writer
Ray Howard-Jones (1903–1996), Berkshire-born artist who lived in Penarth from an early age 
Ann Harriet Hughes (1852–1910), Welsh-language novelist, poet
Ellen Hughes (1867–1927), Welsh-language writer, suffragist, temperance reformer
Megan Hughes (born 1977), cyclist
Nerys Hughes (born 1941), actress
Judith Humphreys (born 1988), actress
Ellen Hunter (born 1968), cyclist
Ruth Hussey, from 2012 to 2014: Chief Medical Officer for Wales
Jane Hutt (born 1949), politician
Joan Hutt (1913–1985), Hertfordshire-born painter who moved to live in North Wales in 1949
Emily Huws (born 1942), Welsh-language children's writer

I
Elisabeth Inglis-Jones (1900–1994), novelist
Norah Isaac (1915–2003), Welsh-language short story writer, playwright, travel writer

J
Katrina Jacks (born 1986), rower
Angharad James (1677–1749), poet and harpist
Becky James (born 1991), cyclist
Irene James (born 1952), politician
Jynine James (born 1972), actress, singer
Maria James (1793–1868), Welsh-born American poet
Stephanie James (born 1985), actress
Kate Jarman (born 1980), actress
Ruth Jên (born 1964), painter, illustrator
Katherine Jenkins (born 1980), singer
Kathryn Jenkins (1961–2009), scholar and writer of Welsh hymns
Joan, Lady of Wales (c.1191–1237), wife of Llywelyn the Great
Gwen John (1876–1939), painter
Margaret John (1926–2011), actress
Glynis Johns (born 1923), actress, pianist, singer
Alex Jones (born 1977), television presenter
Alice Gray Jones (1852–1943), writer, editor
Ann Jones (born 1953), politician
Della Jones (born 1946), singer
Dora Herbert Jones (1890–1974), administrator and singer
Elin Jones (born 1966), politician
Elizabeth Jane Louis Jones  (1889–1952), scholar
Frances Môn Jones (1919–2000), harpist and teacher
Gwyneth Jones (born 1936), singer
Iona Jones (active since 1986), broadcaster, television executive
Louise Jones (born 1963), cyclist
Mai Jones (1899–1960) songwriter, entertainer and radio producer
Mary Jones (1896–1990), actress
Mary Lloyd Jones (born 1934), painter, printmaker
Mary Vaughan Jones (1918–1983), children's writer, teacher
Ruth Jones (born 1966), actress, writer
Ruth Jones, Labour Party politician
Sue Jones-Davies (born 1949), actress, singer

K
Katheryn of Berain (1534–1591), noblewoman
Gwyneth Keyworth (active since 2009), actress
Nyree Kindred (born 1980), swimmer
Christine Kinsey (born 1942), painter

L
Margaret Lacey (1910–1989), actress, ballet teacher
Kate Lambert (active since 2000s), model, fashion designer
Sarah Lark (born 1983), singer, actress
Lisa Lazarus (born 1987), model, actress
Nancy Lee (born 1970), Welsh-born short story writer, novelist, now in Canada
Ruby Levick (c.1872–1940), sculptor
Donna Lewis (born 1973), singer, musician
Eiluned Lewis (1900–1979), novelist, poet, journalist
Emmeline Lewis Lloyd (1827–1913), mountaineer
Gwyneth Lewis (born 1959), Welsh-language poet, national poet of Wales, also writes in English
Princess Lilian, Duchess of Halland (1915–2013), fashion model, Swedish princess
Danielle Lineker (born 1979), actress, model
Betsan Llwyd, actress, since 2012, Arts Director of Bara Caws
Margaret Lloyd (1709–1762), Moravian missionary
Mary Lloyd (1819–1896), sculptor
Mary Lloyd Jones (born 1934), painter
Sian Lloyd (born 1972), news presenter
Siân Lloyd (born 1958), weather presenter
Angharad Llwyd (1780–1866), antiquary
Eirian Llwyd (1951–2014), artist
Martha Llwyd (1766–1845), poet, hymnist
Jemma Lowe (born 1990), swimmer

M
Georgia Mackenzie (born 1973), actress
Margaret Mackworth, 2nd Viscountess Rhondda (1883–1958), businesswoman and suffragette
Ruth Madoc (born 1943), actress, singer
Sharon Maguire (born 1960), film director
Ruth Manning-Sanders (1886–1988), poet, children's writer
Edith Mansell Moullin (1859–1941), suffragist
Deborah Manship (born 1953), actress
Ursula Masson (1945–2008), educator, literature researcher, non-fiction writer
Cerys Matthews (born 1969), singer, songwriter, broadcaster, writer
Gwerful Mechain (c.1460–1502), early Welsh-language poet
Nia Medi, since 2005, Welsh-language novelist, actress
Leila Megàne (1891–1960), opera singer
Sandy Mewies (born 1950), politician
Dorothy Miles (1931–1993), poet, wrote in English and sign language
Ruby Miller (born 1992), cyclist
Tracey Moberly (born 1964), multidisciplinary artist
Ann Moray (1909–1981), novelist, short story writer, singer
Diana Morgan (1908–1996), playwright, screenwriter
Elaine Morgan (1920–2013), playwright, non-fiction writer
Gwenllian Elizabeth Fanny Morgan (1852–1939), mayor, antiquarian
Helen Morgan (born 1952), model
Kate Alicia Morgan (born 1983), model, actress
Sally Moore (born 1962), painter
Beth Morris (born 1949), actress
Siwan Morris (born 1976), actress
Moelona, pen name of Elizabeth Mary Jones (1877–1953), Welsh-language novelist, children's writer, translator
Becky Morgan (born 1974), golfer
Chloe-Beth Morgan (born 1986), model
Elaine Morgan (1920–2013), non-fiction writer on anthropology, playwright, columnist
Elaine Morgan (born 1960), singer
Elena Puw Morgan (1900–1973), Welsh-language novelist, children's writer
Eluned Morgan (1870–1938), Welsh-language author from Patagonia, travel writer, non-fiction writer
Kate Alicia Morgan (born 1983), model
Sharon Morgan (born 1949), actress
Kay Morley-Brown (born 1963), athlete
Kelly Morgan (born 1975), badminton player
Penelope Mortimer (1918–1999), journalist, biographer, novelist
Sophie Moulds (born 1992), model
Wendy Mulford (born 1941), poet, feminist
Catherine Murphy (born 1975), athlete
Eve Myles (born 1978), actress

N
Lynne Neagle (born 1968), politician
Liz Neal (born 1973), artist based in London
Mary Edith Nepean (1876–1960), writer
Mavis Nicholson (born 1930), writer, broadcaster
Kimberley Nixon (1985), actress

O
Pixie O'Harris (1903–1991), Welsh-born Australian artist, poet, autobiographer, illustrator
Tessie O'Shea (1913–1997), stand-up comedian
Angharad ferch Owain (1065–1162), queen of Gwynedd
Bethan Ellis Owen (active since 1990s), actress
Lucy Owen (born 1970), television news reader
Mary Owen (1796–1875), hymnwriter
Meg Wynn Owen (born 1939), actress
Morfydd Llwyn Owen (1891–1918), composer, pianist and singer

P
Suzanne Packer (born 1958), actress
Joanna Page (born 1978), actress
Lisa Palfrey (active since 1990s), actress
Davinia Palmer (born 1980), television presenter, voice-over artist, now in the United States
Stephanie Parker (1987–2009), actress
Molly Parkin (born 1932), painter, novelist, journalist
Blanche Parry (1507–1590), personal attendant of Queen Elizabeth I
Sarah Winifred Parry (1870–1953), writer
Caryl Parry Jones (born 1958), singer, songwriter, actress, composer
Amy Parry-Williams (1910–1988), singer, writer
Karen Paullada (active since 2000s), actress
Sarah Payne, probation executive
Allison Pearson (born 1960), journalist, writer
Jessie Penn-Lewis (1861–1927), evangelist, religious writer, magazine publisher
Anne Penny (1729–1784), poet
Mary Penry (1735–1804), Moravian sister in Pennsylvania
Kelly-Louise Pesticcio (born 1974), beauty pageant winner 
Pauline Peters (born 1896), actress
Pascale Petit (born 1953), poet
Karen Paullada (active since 2009), actress
Carys Phillips (born 1992), rugby union player
Lauren Phillips (born 1981), actress
Mary Elizabeth Phillips (1875–1956), medical doctor
Siân Phillips (born 1933), actress
Jayne Pierson (active since 2009), fashion designer
Eleanor Pilgrim (born 1977), golfer
Katherine Philips (1632–1664), poet, translator
Victoria Plucknett (born 1953), actress
Annie Powell (1906–1986), politician
Shona Powell Hughes (born 1991), rugby union player
Angharad Price, novelist since 1999, academic
Dilys Price (1932–2020), educator and parachutist
Maria Pride (born 1970), actress
Myfanwy Pryce (1890–1976), novelist

Q
Mary Quant (born 1934), fashion designer

R
Allen Raine, pen name of Anne Adalisa Beynon Puddicombe (1836–1908), novelist, wrote in English and Welsh
Elizabeth Randles (c.1801–1829), harpist and pianist 
Susannah Jane Rankin (1897–1989), minister, educator, translator
Helen Raynor (born 1972), television screenwriter, script editor, playwright
Cara Readle (born 1991), actress
Angharad Rees (1944–2012), actress
Deryn Rees-Jones, since 1994, poet, essayist
Dorothy Rees (1898–1987), Labour Party politician
Sarah Jane Rees (1839–1916), teacher, poet, temperance campaigner
Shelley Rees (active since 1990s), actress
Yvette Rees (active in the 1960s and 1970s), actress
Sian Reese-Williams (born 1981), actress
Nicola Reynolds (born 1972), actress
Beti Rhys (1907–2003), bookseller and author
Elen Rhys (active since 2011), actress
Nest ferch Rhys (1085–1136), princess of Deheubarth
Shani Rhys James (born 1953), Australia-born painter, moved to Wales after graduation
Mandy Rice-Davies (1944–2014), model, showgirl, writer
Ceri Richards (1903–1971), painter
Nansi Richards (1888–1979), harpist
Rosalind Richards (active since 2000s), actress
Mandy Rice-Davies (born 1986), actress
Alexandra Roach (born 1987), actress
Beth Robert (active since 1987), actress
Kate Roberts (1891–1985), leading Welsh-language novelist, short story writer
Nia Roberts (born 1972), actress
Rachel Roberts (1927–1980), actress
Sally Roberts Jones (born 1935), poet, biographer
Nia Roberts (born 1979), actress
Beth Robert (born 1979), actress
Philippa Roles (born 1978), discus thrower
Ceinwen Rowlands (1905–1983), soprano
Jane Helen Rowlands (1891–1955), scholar, missionary
Bernice Rubens (1923–2004), novelist, author of The Elected Member
Joan Ruddock (born 1943), politician

S
Saint Non (c. 5th–6th century), saint, mother of Saint David
Rhian Samuel (born 1944), composer
Molly Scott Cato (born 1963), politician, economist
Lisa Scott-Lee (born 1975), singer
Helen Sear (born 1955), photographic artist
Carole Seymour-Jones (born 1963), biographer, columnist, literary non-fiction writer
Caroline Sheen (born 1976), actress 
Sarah Siddons (1755–1831), actress
Dorothy Simpson (born 1933), mystery novelist, crime-fiction writer
Karen Sinclair (born 1952), politician
Caroline Skeel (1872–1951), historian
Sylvia Sleigh (1916–2010), Welsh-born American painter
Dorothy Squires (1915–1998), singer
Florence Smithson (1884–1936), actress, singer
Emma Stansfield (born 1978), actress
Alison Statton (born 1959), singer
Irene Steer (1889–1947), swimmer 
Jaci Stephen (born 1958), journalist, broadcaster, actress, writer
Catrin Stewart (born 1988), actress
Sara Sugarman (born 1962), actress, film director
Jessica Sula (born 1994), actress
Jennifer Sullivan (born 1945), children's writer, critic
Rosie Swale-Pope (born 1946), marathon runner, non-fiction writer
Alia Syed (born 1964), Swansea-born artist and filmmaker, now living and working in London

T
Myfanwy Talog (1944–1995), actress
Helen Thomas (1966–1989), peace activist
Imogen Thomas (born 1982), model
Louie Myfanwy Thomas (1908–1968), novelist
Lucy Thomas (1781–1847), businesswoman
Lynda Thomas (born 1981), musician, singer-songwriter
Madoline Thomas (1890–1989), actress
Margaret Thomas (1779–?), hymnwriter
Queenie Thomas (1898–1977), film actress
Rachel Thomas (1905–1995), actress
Sarah Thomas (born 1981), field hockey player
Sian Thomas (born 1953), actress
Hester Thrale (1741–1821), diarist
Lily Tobias (1887–1984), novelist, short story writer, activist
Angela Tooby (born 1960), athlete, runner
Susan Tooby (born 1960), athlete, runner
Catherine Tregenna (active since 2000s), playwright, scriptwriter, actress
Barbara Margaret Trimble (1921–1995), novelist
Hayley Tullett (born 1975), athlete, runner
Bonnie Tyler (born 1951), singer
Irene Steer (1889–1947), swimmer

U
Meena Upadhyaya (active since 2000s), medical geneticist

V
Hilda Vaughan (1892–1985), novelist, short story writer, playwright, author of The Invader
Leona Vaughan (born 1995), actress
Lisa Victoria (born 1973), actress

W
Kirsty Wade (born 1962), athlete, runner
Helen Wadsworth (born 1964), golfer
Lucy Walter  (c.1630–1658), mistress of Charles I
Melanie Walters (born 1963), actress
Jo Walton (born 1964), Welsh-Canadian romance and science fiction novelist, author of Tooth and Claw
Anna Laetitia Waring (1823–1910), poet, hymnist
Myfanwy Waring (born 1974), actress
Mary Wynne Warner (1932–1998), mathematician
Elizabeth Andrew Warren (1786–1864), botanist and marine algolologist 
Sarah Waters (born 1966), novelist, author of Fingersmith
Elizabeth Watkin-Jones (1877–1966), children's author
Megan Watts Hughes (1842–1907), singer, songwriter, scientist
Alis Wen (born 1520), Welsh-language poet
Olive Wheeler (1886–1963), educationist, psychologist and university lecturer
Susie Wild (born 1979), novelist, journalist, editor, strong connections with Wales
Alis Wen (fl. 16th century), poet
Anna Williams (1706–1783), poet
Betty Williams, (born 1944), politician
Buddug Williams (active since the 1990s), actress
Grace Williams (1906–1977), composer
Jane Williams (1806–1885), biographer, non-fiction works, many about Wales
Margaret Lindsay Williams (1888–1960), portrait painter
Maria Jane Williams (c.1794–1873), musician, folklorist
Annie Williams (born 1942), still life watercolour painter who grew up in Wales
Sian Williams (born 1990), rugby union player
Sue Williams (born 1956), visual artist
Saint Winifred (fl. 7th century), saint
Bethan Witcomb (active since 2010), actress
Katy Wix (born 1980), actress, comedian
Leanne Wood (born 1971), politician
Mary Myfanwy Wood (1882–1967), missionary
Frances Elizabeth Wynne (1835–1907), painter, sketcher
Sarah Edith Wynne (1849–1897), soprano

Y
Paula Yates (1959–2000), television presenter, non-fiction writer
Megan York (born 1987), rugby union player

Z
Catherine Zeta-Jones (born 1969), actress

 
+Women
 Welsh